Zizeeria knysna, the dark grass blue or African grass blue, is a species of blue butterfly (Lycaenidae) found in Africa, on Cyprus and the Iberian Peninsula.

Sometimes mistakenly called Zizeeria lysimon (Hübner), that species name is invalid as it is preoccupied by Papilio lisimon Stoll, [1790], a butterfly in the family Riodinidae.

The wingspan is 18–23 mm for males and 21–26 mm for females. The butterfly flies nearly year-round.

The larvae feed on Medicago, Melilotus, Acanthyllis, Armeria delicatula, Polygonum equisetiforme, Tribulus terrestris and Oxalis.

Gallery

References

External links
 Butterflies of Europe
 Zizeeria at Markku Savela's Lepidoptera and Some Other Life Forms

Polyommatini
Butterflies of Africa
Butterflies of Europe
Fauna of Cyprus
Fauna of the Iberian Peninsula
Butterflies described in 1862